was a Japanese comedy-action police TV series. It starred regulars Masao Kusakari, Tatsuya Fuji, Joe Shishido, Mayumi Ogawa, with Kyohei Shibata as a semi-regular. It ran for 25 episodes in 1981 and won popularity. Yoichi Sai made his debut as a director in the episode 15.

Plot
Former detective Jun Mizuhara and former Journalist Shunsuke Ryuzaki set up office as a private detective agency " M&R Tantesha" in Yokohama.　Their cases are always dangerous but not profitable.

Cast
Masao Kusakari as Shunsuke Ryuzaki (Ryu)
Tatsuya Fuji as Jun Mizuhara (Mizusan)
Joe Shishido as Detective Yuzo Kikushima
Kyōhei Shibata as Goto
Nenji Kobayashi as Detective Goro Kido
Yuko Natori as Yumi
Mayumi Ogawa as Reiko Tachibana

References

Japanese drama television series
Japanese police procedural television series
Detective television series
Japanese detective television drama series